Ebner is a Germanic surname. Notable people with the surname include:

 Adalbert Ebner (1851–1898), German Catholic clergyman and liturgiologist
 Annemarie Ebner, Austrian luger
 Christina Ebner (1277–1356), German nun and writer
 Ede Virág-Ébner (1912-1951), a Hungarian wrestler
 Ferdinand Ebner (1882–1931), Austrian philosopher
 Franklin E. Ebner (1904–1979), American lawyer and politician
 Harald Ebner (born 1964), German politician
 Hieronymus Wilhelm Ebner von Eschenbach (1673–1752), German diplomat, historian, and scholar
 Klaus Ebner (born 1964), Austrian writer, essayist, poet, and translator
 Lola Beer Ebner (1910–1997), Israeli fashion designer
 Margareta Ebner (1291–1351), German mystic and visionary
 Marie von Ebner-Eschenbach (1830–1916), Austrian writer
 Mark Ebner (born 1959), American investigative journalist 
 Martin Ebner (born 1945), Swiss billionaire businessman
 Michl Ebner (born 1952), Italian politician
 Nate Ebner (born 1988), American football and rugby player
 Thomas Ebner, Austrian footballer
 Thomas Ebner (athlete), Austrian athlete
 Trestan Ebner (born 1999), American football player
 Victor von Ebner (1842–1925), Austrian anatomist and histologist

German-language surnames